Carolyn C. Kuranz is an American plasma physicist whose research involves the use of high-powered lasers at the National Ignition Facility both to help develop inertial confinement fusion and to study how matter behaves in conditions similar to those in shock waves in astrophysics. She is an associate professor at the University of Michigan, in the Department of Nuclear Engineering and Radiological Sciences.

Education and career
Kuranz majored in physics at Bryn Mawr College, advised there by Peter Beckman, and graduated with honors in 2002. She went to the University of Michigan for graduate study in applied physics, where she earned a master's degree in 2004 and completed her Ph.D. in 2009, under the supervision of R. Paul Drake.

She remained at the University of Michigan as a researcher in the Center for Radiative Shock Hydrodynamics, beginning in 2009. In 2019, she moved to a faculty position in the Department of Nuclear Engineering and Radiological Sciences. She is also affiliated with the Department of Climate and Space Sciences and Engineering.

In 2020, she was named to the national Fusion Energy Sciences Advisory Committee, an advisory committee to the United States Department of Energy.

Recognition
Kuranz was named a Fellow of the American Physical Society (APS) in 2019, after a nomination from the APS Division of Plasma Physics, "for spearheading academic use of the National Ignition Facility for seminal experiments in plasma laboratory astrophysics, specifically the effects of locally generated intense radiation on an interface and on astrophysically relevant interfacial instabilities".

References

External links

Year of birth missing (living people)
Living people
American physicists
American women physicists
Bryn Mawr College alumni
University of Michigan alumni
University of Michigan faculty
Fellows of the American Physical Society